Women's Political Club (Polish: Klub Polityczny Kobiet Postępowych) was a Polish women's organisation. It was founded in 1919 to encourage women to use the new political rights and equality granted in the constitution of the new Polish state in all of areas of society. It was a progressive political club for educated elite women.

References
 Polskie Kobiece Stowarzyszenia i Związki Współpracy Międzynarodowej Kobiet , oprac. J. Bełcikowski, Warszawa 1939, str. 49.

1919 in Poland
Feminist organisations in Poland
1919 establishments in Poland